Bukka Raya II (born 1363, reign 1405–1406 CE) was an emperor of the Vijayanagara Empire from the Sangama Dynasty.

After the death of Harihara II, the succession of the throne was disputed amongst and eventually changed hands between Harihara II's three sons: Virupaksha Raya, Bukka Raya II, and Deva Raya I. First, Virupaksha Raya managed to rule for a few months before he was murdered by his own sons. Bukka Raya II then succeeded Virupaksha as emperor of the Vijayanagara Empire. However similar to his brother before him, Bukka Raya II only reigned for a short time period before he too was be overthrown by his brother Deva Raya I who took the throne.

External links
https://web.archive.org/web/20051219170139/http://www.aponline.gov.in/quick%20links/HIST-CULT/history_medieval.html
http://www.ourkarnataka.com/states/history/historyofkarnatagggfgbnjjka40.htm

1406 deaths
People of the Vijayanagara Empire
15th-century Indian monarchs
1363 births
Indian Hindus
Hindu monarchs
Sangama dynasty